Karl Neuner (16 January 1902 – 20 March 1949) was a German skier. He competed in the Nordic combined event at the 1928 Winter Olympics.

References

External links
 
 Olympics profile

1902 births
1949 deaths
German male Nordic combined skiers
Olympic Nordic combined skiers of Germany
Nordic combined skiers at the 1928 Winter Olympics
Sportspeople from Garmisch-Partenkirchen